Homosexual sexual practices are sexual practices within the context of homosexuality. These include:
Gay sexual practices
Lesbian sexual practices

See also
Human sexual activity#Homosexuality
Transgender sexuality#Sexual practices
Men who have sex with men
Women who have sex with women
Situational sexual behavior